Luis Marti is an electrical engineer at Hydro One Networks Inc. in Toronto, Ontario until March 2017. He was named a Fellow of the Institute of Electrical and Electronics Engineers (IEEE) in 2015 for his contributions to modeling and simulation of electromagnetic transients.

References

20th-century births
Living people
Fellow Members of the IEEE
Year of birth missing (living people)
Place of birth missing (living people)